Events in the year 1938 in Japan. It corresponds to Shōwa 13 (昭和13年) in the Japanese calendar.

Incumbents
Emperor: Hirohito
Prime Minister: Fumimaro Konoe

Governors
Aichi Prefecture: Kotaro Tanaka
Akita Prefecture: Kiyoshi Honma (until 24 June); Kaoru Sasaki (starting 24 June)
Aomori Prefecture: Masanori Ogawa (until 1 March); Shizuo Furukawa (starting 1 March)
Ehime Prefecture: Shizuo Furukawa (until 15 July); Yoshio Mochinaga (starting 15 July)
Fukui Prefecture: Nakano Yoshiro (until 17 April); Kiyoshi Kimura (starting 17 April)
Fukuoka Prefecture: Kyuichi Komada (starting 1939)
Fukushima Prefecture: Seikichi Kimishima (until 5 September); Seikichi Hashimoto (starting 5 September)
Gifu Prefecture: Miyano Shozo
Gunma Prefecture: Shozo Tsuchiya
Hiroshima Prefecture: Aijiro Tomita (until 9 November); Ichisho Inuma (starting 9 November)
Ibaraki Prefecture: Nobuo Hayashi (until 11 January); Shigeru Hamaza (starting 11 January)
Ishikawa Prefecture: Masasuke Kodama (until 1938); Shunsuke Kondo (starting 1938)
Iwate Prefecture: Chiyoji Yukizawa
Kagawa Prefecture: Nagatoshi Fujioka
Kumamoto Prefecture: Fujioka Nagawa
Kochi Prefecture: Kobayashi Mitsumasa
Kyoto Prefecture: Keiichi Suzuki
Mie Prefecture: Masatoshi Sato
Miyagi Prefecture: Yoshio Kikuyama
Miyazaki Prefecture: Katsuroku Aikawa
Nagasaki Prefecture: Jitsuzo Kawanishi
Nagano Prefecture: 
 until 11 January: Shinsuke Kondo 
 11 January-23 December: Seiichi Omora 
 starting 23 December: Tomita Kenji
Niigata Prefecture: Sekiya Nobuyuki (until 24 June); Yasujiro Nakamura (starting 24 June)
Okayama Prefecture: Hisashi Kurashige (until 24 June); Fusataro Fuchigami (starting 24 June)
Okinawa Prefecture: Hisashi Kurashige (until 24 June); Fusataro Fuchigami (starting 24 June)
Saga Prefecture: Tomoichi Koyama
Saitama Prefecture: Jitsuzo Kawanishi (until 22 April); Toki Ginjiro (starting 22 April)
Shiname Prefecture: ...
Tochigi Prefecture: Adachi Shuuritsu
Tokyo: Tetsuji Kan (until 24 June); Okada Shuzo (starting 24 June)
Toyama Prefecture: Ginjiro Toki (until 18 April); Kenzo Yano (starting 18 April)
Yamagata Prefecture: Takei Yoshitsugu

Events
January - Taihoku Air Strike
January–June - Battle of Northern and Eastern Henan
January 1
 According to Japanese government official report, a roof building suddenly collapsed due snow in Kugaiza Cinema House, Tokamachi, Niigata Prefecture, killing 69 people and injuring 92. 
 Pioneer Corporation was founded, as predecessor name was Fukuin Electronics Manufacturing.
January 6 – Construction brand, Kumagai Gumi (熊谷組) has founded in Fukui City.
March 24 - National Mobilization Law
March 24-April 7 - Battle of Taierzhuang
March 24-May 1 - Battle of Xuzhou
May - Battle of Lanfeng
May 10–12 - Amoy Operation
May 21 - Tsuyama massacre
June 8 – Tokyo Film Production, as predecessor of Toei was founded.
June 11-October 27 - Battle of Wuhan
July 1 - Battle of Xinfeng
July 5 – A heavy torrential rain with debris flow hit around Mount Rokko area, Hyogo Prefecture, official death number toll was 715 persons, according to Japanese government confirmed report. 
July 29-August 11 - Battle of Lake Khasan
August 24 – According to Japanese government official confirmed report, two plane collided, following to crash and caught fire on factory in Omori region (now Ota, Tokyo), official death toll was 70, with 60 persons were wounded.
October 1–11 - Battle of Wanjialing
October–December - Canton Operation
December 27 – 1938 Unazuki avalanche, 84 persons were fatalities in Toyama Prefecture, according to Japanese government official confirmed report.

Births
January 13 – Nachi Nozawa, Japanese voice actor (d. 2010)
January 14 – Morihiro Hosokawa, politician and 50th Prime Minister of Japan
January 23 – Giant Baba, professional wrestler (d. 1999)
January 25 
 Shotaro Ishinomori, author, manga artist, Father of "Henshin heroes" (d. 1998)
 Leiji Matsumoto, mango artist judoka (d. 2023)
 January 29 – Shuji Tsurumi, Olympic gymnast
February 4  – Isao Inokuma, judoka (d. 2001)
March 11 – Tatsuo Umemiya, actor, tarento, and businessman (d. 2019)
March 30 – Chiyoko Shimakura, enka singer (d. 2013)
March 31 – Michiko Nomura, actress and voice actress
April 22 – Issey Miyake, fashion designer
June 28 – Yōko Sano, writer and illustrator (d. 2010)
July 9 – Tura Satana, Japanese-born American actress (d. 2011)
September 3 – Ryōji Noyori, chemist, Nobel Prize laureate
September 8 – Kenichi Horie, adventurer
November 22 – Niro Shimada, Chief Justice of the Supreme Court of Japan
October 31 – Kei Tomiyama, actor, voice actor and narrator (d. 1995)
November 30 – Makio Inoue, actor and voice actor (d. 2019)
December 16 – Liv Ullmann, Norwegian actress

Deaths
February 2 – Momosuke Fukuzawa, businessman (b. 1868)
May 4 – Kanō Jigorō, educator and founder of Judo (b. 1860)
July 25 – Kōsaku Hamada, academic, archaeologist, author and President of Kyoto University (b. 1881)
September 17 – Sadao Yamanaka, film director and screenwriter (b. 1909)
October 5 – Chieko Takamura, artist (b. 1886)
October 19 – Prince Fushimi Hiroyoshi (b. 1897)
November 20 – Enzo Matsunaga, author (b. 1895)

See also
 List of Japanese films of the 1930s

References 

 
1930s in Japan
Japan